Egede may refer to:

Places
 Egede (crater), a lunar crater
 Egede, Netherlands
 Egede, Enugu, Nigeria
 Hans Egede Church, Nuuk, Greenland

People
 Hans Egede (1686–1758), Dano-Norwegian merchant and missionary to Greenland
 Hans Egede Budtz (1889–1968), Danish stage and film actor
 Hans Egede Saabye (1746–1817), Danish missionary and scholar in Greenland, and grandson of Hans Egede
 Múte Bourup Egede (born 1987), Greenlandic politician
 Paul Egede (1708–1789), Dano-Norwegian missionary and scholar in Greenland, and son of Hans Egede
 Adam Egede-Nissen (1868–1952), Norwegian communist politician
 Aud Egede-Nissen (1893–1974), Norwegian actress

Norwegian-language surnames
Surnames of Norwegian origin
Surnames of Danish origin
Danish-language surnames